David Gareth Bryan-Jones (born 25 February 1943) is a British middle-distance runner. He competed in the men's 3000 metres steeplechase at the 1968 Summer Olympics.

References

1943 births
Living people
Athletes (track and field) at the 1968 Summer Olympics
British male middle-distance runners
British male steeplechase runners
Olympic athletes of Great Britain
Place of birth missing (living people)